China Railway Shanghai Group, officially abbreviated as CR Shanghai or CR-Shanghai, formerly, Shanghai Railway Administration is a subsidiaries company under the jurisdiction of the China Railway (formerly the Ministry of Railways). As of 2007, the bureau was in charge of a total length of 10,810.5 kilometers, and a commercial length of 4,928.1 kilometers of railways. It oversees 503 stations and manages the railways in Shanghai, Jiangsu, Anhui and Zhejiang Provinces. Shanghai Railway Bureau estimated that by 2010 its commercial length of railways will be more than 7,060 km, including over 1,500 km of the inter-city railway. The railway administration was reorganized as a company in November 2017.

Hub stations
 Shanghai
 Nanjing
 , 
 Hangzhou
 Hefei
 , 
 Changzhou
 
 Wuxi
 , 
 Suzhou

Regional services

S-train services
  Ningbo Suburban Railway
  (S1)
 Shaoxing Suburban Railway
 
 Lianyungang Suburban Railway
 
 Shanghai

Other services

References

External links 
 

Ministry of Railways of China
Rail transport in Shanghai
China Railway Corporation